Nikolayevsky railway station may refer to:
Nikolayevsky station, other name of Leningradsky railway station, a rail terminal in Moscow
Nikolayevsky station, other name of Moskovsky Rail Terminal, a rail terminal in St. Petersburg